This is a list of cheeses by place of origin. Cheese is a milk-based food that is produced in wide-ranging flavors, textures, and forms. Hundreds of types of cheese from various countries are produced. Their styles, textures and flavors depend on the origin of the milk (including the animal's diet), whether they have been pasteurized, the butterfat content, the bacteria and mold, the processing, and aging.
 
Herbs, spices, or wood smoke may be used as flavoring agents. The yellow to red color of many cheeses, such as Red Leicester, is normally formed from adding annatto. While most current varieties of cheese may be traced to a particular locale, or culture, within a single country, some have a more diffuse origin, and cannot be considered to have originated in a particular place, but are associated with a whole region, such as queso blanco in Latin America.
 
Cheese is an ancient food whose origins predate recorded history. There is no conclusive evidence indicating where cheesemaking originated, either in Europe, Central Asia or the Middle East, but the practice had spread within Europe prior to Roman times and, according to Pliny the Elder, had become a sophisticated enterprise by the time the Roman Empire came into existence.
 
In this list, types of cheeses are included; brand names are only included if they apply to a distinct variety of cheese.

Africa

Benin

Ethiopia

Mauritania

Asia

Armenia

Azerbaijan

Bangladesh

China

The dominant Han Chinese culture is not dairy-centric. However, some indigenous sociolinguistic groups in regions of the country, such as Inner Mongolia, Tibet and Yunnan, have strong cheese traditions.

Cyprus

Georgia

India

Indonesia

Japan

Korea

Malaysia

Mongolia

There are two types of Mongolian cheese (бяслаг). They are similar in taste and are like a cross between mozzarella and an unsalted feta cheese.
 түүхий сүүний – this is a creamy version of Mongolian cheese made by boiling the milk and keeping the cream top.
 болсон сүүний – this is similar but is made without the cream.

Nepal

Philippines

Europe

Albania

Austria

Belgium

Bosnia and Herzegovina

Bulgaria

Croatia

Czech Republic

Denmark

Estonia

Finland

France

Germany

Germany's cheese production comprises approximately one-third of the total for all European-produced cheeses.

Greece

Hungary

Iceland

Ireland

'''

Italy

Jews of Eastern Europe

Kosovo

Latvia

Lithuania

 Džiugas

Malta

Moldova

Montenegro

Netherlands

The Netherlands is one of the major cheese producing countries of Europe, with a tradition of cheesemaking as shown by the Dutch cheese markets.

North Macedonia

Norway

Poland

The history of cheesemaking in Poland goes back to 5500 BC, when cheese similar to mozzarella was produced in Neolithic times in Kujawy (north-central Poland).

Portugal

Romania

Russia

Adygheysky
Altaysky a fairly dry hard cheese, similar to Swiss cheese, originating in the Altai region
Chyorny Altai a hard cheese similar to cheddar
Danilovsky
Dorogobuzhsky a soft cheese from western Russia
Dorozhny
Golandsky
Gornoaltaysky a hard, crumbly cheese
Kostromskoy
Moale
Moskovsky a hard cow's milk cheese, also similar to Swiss
Medynsky
Omichka a slightly sweet, soft processed cheese made of cow's milk
Pikantny
Poshekhonsky a hard cow's milk cheese
Rossiysky similar to German Tilsiter (:ru:Российский сыр )
Sovetsky
Uglichsky a hard cheese made of cow's milk
Yaroslavsky a hard cow's milk cheese, usually produced in rounds; with a slightly sour taste
Zakusochny a soft blue cow's milk cheese

Serbia

 Sremski
 Zlatarski PDO
 Sjenički
 Svrljiški Belmuz
 Krivovirski Kačkavalj
 Homoljski ovčiji (Homolje sheep cheese)
 Homoljski kozji (Homolje goat cheese)
 Homoljski kravlji (Homolje cow cheese)
 Pirotski Kačkavalj
 Lužnička Vurda
 Užički Kajmak
 Čačanski Kajmak
 Čačanski Sir

Slovakia

Slovenia

 Bohinc Jože
 Nanoški
 Planinski

Spain

Sweden

Switzerland

Switzerland is home to over 450 varieties of cheese. Cows milk is used in about 99 percent of the cheeses produced. The remaining share is made up of sheep milk and goat milk.

Ukraine

United Kingdom

The British Cheese Board states that there are over 700 named British cheeses produced in the UK.

Middle East

Egypt

Iran

Israel

Levant

The Levant is a geographical region east of the Mediterranean Sea which includes the countries of Syria, Lebanon, Israel, Jordan, Palestine and sometimes it includes Cyprus and the Turkish province of Hatay

Turkey

North and Central America

Canada

Costa Rica

El Salvador

Honduras

Mexico

Nicaragua

United States

Oceania

Australia

New Zealand

South America

Argentina

Bolivia

Brazil

Chile

Colombia

Paraguay

Peru

Uruguay

Venezuela

Other
Some types of cheese were either developed in various locales independently (usually as un-aged products from the beginning stages of dairy processing and cheesemaking), or are not actually cheese products. Examples include:

Unsorted
 Tresse cheese

See also

 Category: Cheeses by country
 
 Butter cheese
 
 List of blue cheeses
 List of cheese dishes
 List of cheesemakers
 List of dairy products
 List of goat milk cheeses
 List of smoked foods
 List of stretch-curd cheeses
 
 List of sheep milk cheeses
 List of water buffalo cheeses

Articles by country

 
 List of American cheeses
 List of British cheeses
 List of Cornish cheeses
 List of Dutch cheeses
 List of English cheeses
 List of French cheeses
 List of German cheeses
 List of Irish cheeses
 List of Italian cheeses
 List of Polish cheeses
 List of Spanish cheeses
 List of Swiss cheeses

Protected cheeses

 List of European cheeses with protected geographical status
 List of French Protected Designations of Origin cheeses
 List of Greek Protected Designations of Origin cheeses
 List of Italian DOP cheeses
 List of Portuguese cheeses with protected status

References

External links

 Alphabetical list of cheeses. Cheese.com.

Cheese